Josef Altstötter (4 January 1892 Bad Griesbach (Rottal), Lower Bavaria – 13 November 1979, Nuremberg) was a high-ranking official in the German Ministry of Justice under the Nazi Regime. Following World War II, he was tried by the Nuremberg Military Tribunal as a defendant in the Judges' Trial, where he was acquitted of the most serious charges, but was found guilty of a lesser charge of membership in a criminal organization (the SS).

Professional career 
After serving in World War I, Altstötter completed his law studies in Munich in 1920, passed the state jurisprudence examination and began work in 1921 as deputy judge in the Bavarian Justice Department. In 1927 he worked in the Reich Ministry of Justice. In 1933, he moved to the Supreme Court for Leipzig and finally in 1936 into Reich Labour Court.

From 1939 to 1942 he was with the Wehrmacht. From January 1943 he was back in the Reich Ministry of Justice (Division VI:Civil Law and Justice), where he was appointed in May 1943 chief of the civil law and procedure division ("Reichministerialdirektor"), and remained there throughout the Second World War. He was awarded the Golden Party Badge for service to the Nazi party.

Part of Altstötter's department included the Nuremberg racial laws enacted to isolate Jews from German life and deprive them of civil rights. His office also had responsibility for revising the German inheritance and family law. These revisions were to ensure that after death, the property of Jews would not go to their children, but instead would be forfeited to the German government.

Membership in Nazi organizations 
Prior to its takeover by the Nazi party Altstötter was a member of Der Stahlhelm, a right-wing veterans organisation. After this was restructured as a Nazi organization, Altstötter became a member of the SA (SA-number: Member 31). On 15 May 1937 Altstötter moved from the SA to the SS (membership number 289,254) in 1944 had reached the rank of SS-Oberführer (senior colonel). 
In September 1938 he also joined the Nazi Party (membership number 5,823,836). Josef Altstötter was friendly with high-level SS leaders with, among others, Heinrich Himmler, Ernst Kaltenbrunner and Gottlob Berger.

After the war 
In 1947, Josef Altstötter was one of the accused in the Judges' Trial. The indictment accused him, and other Nazi judges and legal officials of the participation in war crime and crimes against humanity. For Altstötter, the particular allegations against him were that he was criminally involved with both the Nazi racial laws and also with kidnapping and secret murder of people pursuant to the Nazi "Night and Fog Decree". However, there was only sufficient evidence to convict him of membership in the SS. According to the Tribunal, Altstötter

In December 1947, he was sentenced to five years in prison. Altstötter served his sentence at Landsberg Prison and was released on 21 December 1949 (several months early due to good behavior). From 1950 to 1966, he worked as a lawyer. In 1979, at the age of 87 years he died in Nuremberg.

Awards
German Cross in Gold on 25 March 1942 as Major d.B. in the II./Infanterie-Regiment 475

See also
Judges' Trial

Notes

References 

 Ernst Klee: Das Personenlexikon zum Dritten Reich: Wer war was vor und nach 1945. Fischer-Taschenbuch-Verlag, Frankfurt am Main 2007, .
 
 Hermann Weiß (Hrsg.): Biographisches Lexikon zum Dritten Reich, Fischer-Verlag, Frankfurt am Main, 1998,

External links 
 Judge's trial proceedings from the Mazal Library.

1892 births
1979 deaths
People from Bad Griesbach (Rottal)
People from the Kingdom of Bavaria
Nazi Party politicians
Stahlhelm members
Sturmabteilung personnel
SS-Oberführer
People convicted by the United States Nuremberg Military Tribunals
Recipients of the clasp to the Iron Cross, 1st class
Recipients of the Gold German Cross
Judges in the Nazi Party